Island of the Hungry Ghosts is a hybrid documentary film by director Gabrielle Brady that explores the conflict faced by trauma therapist Poh Lin Lee, who works in the Australian Detention Centre for Asylum Seekers on Christmas Island.
It premiered at Tribeca Film Festival in 2018 where it won the Award for Best International Documentary. It was shown at festivals all over the world, winning several prizes. It was also released in cinemas in the United Kingdom, Australia, North America and Germany.

Summary

Located off the coast of Indonesia, the Australian territory of Christmas Island is inhabited by migratory crabs travelling in their millions from the jungle towards the ocean, in a movement that has been provoked by the full moon for hundreds of thousands of years.

Poh Lin Lee is a “trauma therapist” who lives with her family in this seemingly idyllic paradise. Every day, she talks with the asylum seekers held indefinitely in a high-security detention centre hidden in the island’s core, attempting to support them in a situation that is as unbearable as its outcome is uncertain.
As Poh Lin and her family explore the island’s beautiful yet threatening landscape, the local islanders carry out their “hungry ghost” rituals for the spirits of those who died on the island without a burial. They make offerings to appease the lost souls who are said to be wandering the jungles at night looking for home.

In the intimacy of her therapy sessions, as Poh Lin listens to the growing sense of despair of the people she counsels, she begins to feel the creeping dystopia reverberate through her own life.

Island of the Hungry Ghosts is a hybrid documentary that moves between the natural migration and the chaotic and tragic migration of the humans, which is in constant metamorphoses by the unseen decision-making structures.

Accolades

References

External links
  Official Website

2018 films
Documentaries about psychology
Documentary films about immigration
Christmas Island
2010s English-language films